Mario Enrique Ríos Montt, C.M. (born March 17, 1932, in Huehuetenango, Guatemala) is an emeritus auxiliary bishop of the Roman Catholic Archdiocese of Guatemala, public figure and human rights activist. He is the brother of the late former general Efraín Ríos Montt, a dictator accused of genocide in Guatemala during the period when he was in power from March 1982 to August 1983.

Biography

Early years and political views
Mario Montt was born in Huehuetenango on 17 March 1932, in a large family of 13 children of a ruined rural merchant. Biographers of the family Rios Montt contrasted Mario Enrique to his elder brother José Efraín, saying that Efraín liked maps and military parades; Mario every morning went to Mass and prayed after school with the priests.
He entered in the Pauline Fathers and was ordained priest on 12 July 1959. On 13 July 1974 Montt was appointed titular bishop of Tiguala and prelate of Escuintla by Pope Paul VI and was ordained bishop on 27 September of the same year by Apostolic nuncio um Guatemala, Archbishop Emanuele Gerada. His co-consecrators were the Bishop of San Miguel, José Eduardo Alvarez Ramírez, CM, and Victor Hugo Martínez Contreras, Auxiliary Bishop of the Huehuetenango.

Montt adopted the left-oriented liberation theology (which opposed him to his elder brother Efraín who converted himself to evangelicalism from Catholicism). He still supported anti-government political speeches of the Guatemalan Catholic Church - protests against repression, calls for active social policies and the fight against poverty.

Political confrontation with his brother
On March 23, 1982, as a result of a military coup to power in Guatemala came the military junta, led by 
Efraín Ríos Montt, who took office as president. The regime of ultra-right dictatorship was established and a civil war and political repression have reached unprecedented scale. At the same time, the ruling group was distinguished by a fanatical Protestant evangelism and was suspicious of the Catholic population.

Under the Riosmontist regime, Mario Rios Montt publicly opposed the repressive policies of his elder brother. On the advice of the head of state, the titular bishop had to leave the country temporarily and move to Italy.

Bishop and human rights
After the change of power in August 1983, Montt returned to Guatemala and on March 3, 1984, resigned as prelate of Escuintla.

On 24 January 1987 he was appointed Auxiliary Bishop of the Archdiocese of Guatemala and since 1998 he is the Vicar of Pastoral of the same.

On 26 April 1998 Bishop Juan Gerardi was assassinated, two days after publishing his report Guatemala: Never Again, where he presented evidence forty years of repression in that country: 200,000 Indians killed and one million exiled. Nine out of ten victims were unarmed, mostly indigenous, civilians. More than 90% of the crimes had been the responsibility of the Guatemalan State. Mario Enrique Ríos Montt took over in this year his duties in the Office of Human Rights of the Archdiocese of Guatemala (ODHA) and became an influential and powerful opponent of his brother.

Montt criticized the former military regimes for brutality and civil governments for corruption.

In the socio-political aspect, Mario Enrique Rios Montt was the opponent of Jose Efraín Rios Montt. However, the brothers meet at family celebrations and communicate in a friendly manner, trying to avoid discussing politics.

Retirement
On October 2, 2010, Pope Benedict XVI accepted his resignation for reasons of age and on July 26, 2011, Montt was appointed apostolic administrator of the Vicariate of Izabal, where he replaced Bishop Gabriel Peñate Rodríguez till 9 February 2013.

References

External links
 Catholic Hierarchy website

Living people
1932 births
20th-century Roman Catholic bishops in Guatemala
21st-century Roman Catholic bishops in Guatemala
20th-century Roman Catholic titular bishops
Guatemalan human rights activists
Vincentian bishops
People from Huehuetenango Department
Liberation theologians
Roman Catholic bishops of Escuintla